Albion is an unincorporated community in Ashland County, in the U.S. state of Ohio.

History
Albion was originally called Perrysburgh, and under the latter name was laid out in 1830. A post office called Albion was established in 1835, and remained in operation until 1903.

References

Unincorporated communities in Ashland County, Ohio
1830 establishments in Ohio
Populated places established in 1830
Unincorporated communities in Ohio